Otto Kissenberth was a German First World War fighter ace credited with 20 confirmed aerial victories. He began his career as an ace in spectacular fashion; at a time when an aerial victory was still a marvel, he shot down three enemy airplanes in a single afternoon on 12 October 1916. Transferred to a fighter squadron, Jagdstaffel 16, he shot down two opposing airplanes, as well as an observation balloon. Promoted to command of Jagdstaffel 23, he shot down 14 more opposing aircraft before being sidelined by an aviation accident.

The victory list

Otto Kissenberth's victories are reported in chronological order, not the order or dates the victories were confirmed by headquarters.
Abbreviations were expanded by the editor creating this list.

Footnote

Citations

Sources

Further reading 
 Guttman, Jon. Balloon-Busting Aces of World War 1 . Osprey Publishing, 2005. , 

Aerial victories of Kissenberth, Otto
Kissenberth, Otto